Nick Mead (born March 12, 1995) is an American rower. He competed in the men's eight event at the 2020 Summer Olympics.

References

External links
 
 Princeton Tigers bio

1995 births
Living people
American male rowers
Olympic rowers of the United States
Rowers at the 2020 Summer Olympics
People from Delaware County, Pennsylvania
Sportspeople from Pennsylvania
Princeton Tigers rowers
World Rowing Championships medalists